is a Japanese-French pianist.

Ebi was born in Osaka. She studied at the Tokyo University of the Arts, and won the piano prize of the 41st Music Competition of Japan. Her international career began with her winning second prize in the 1975 Marguerite Long-Jacques Thibaud Competition in Paris. She continued her studies with Aldo Ciccolini at the Conservatoire de Paris. In 1980, she won fifth prize at the X International Chopin Piano Competition, after which Martha Argerich, who was a member of the jury, took patronage over her.

Ebi is one of the major pianists of our time  and her international career continues with performances around the world, with annual tours in Japan, and annual appearances at international music festivals including Festival de La Roque-d'Anthéron in France, the Echternach Music Festival in Luxembourg, and La Folle Journée in France.

Recordings
Ebi has recorded works by Chopin, Brahms, Liszt, Franck and others. Among her most noteworthy recordings are the two discs "Music of Hikari Ōe" of works by the Japanese composer Hikari Ōe.

Awards
 1975 – second prize in the 16th Long-Thibaud Competition
 1980 – fifth prize (no fourth was awarded) in the 10th International Chopin Piano Competition
 1981 – Leeds International Piano Competition
 1993 – French government Chevalier des Arts et des Lettres, distinction
 2002 – Japanese Exxon-Mobile Music Prize

References

Japanese classical pianists
Japanese women pianists
21st-century French women classical pianists
1953 births
Living people
People from Osaka
Long-Thibaud-Crespin Competition prize-winners
Prize-winners of the International Chopin Piano Competition
Japanese emigrants to France